As per the Census Department (Govt.of India), Rajapakar is a community block (sub-district code-10) of Vaishali district (Code-18) in the Indian State of Bihar (State Code-10). Following is the list of villages in Rajapakar block and their population as per 2011 census of India.

See also

List of villages in Vaishali district

References

Lists of villages in Vaishali district
Rajapakar